GDP-fucose transporter 1 is a protein that in humans is encoded by the SLC35C1 gene.

Defects can be associated with Congenital disorder of glycosylation type IIc.

See also
 Solute carrier family
 EamA

References

Further reading

External links
  GeneReviews/NCBI/NIH/UW entry on Congenital Disorders of Glycosylation Overview

Solute carrier family